Dimitrios Gesios (born 1948) is a former Greek international football player that played as a striker. Gesios spend most of his professional career with Iraklis, where he is their all time top scorer.

Club career
Gesios started his professional career in Kozani, when he was in the town to fulfill his military service. In the summer of 1972 after several teams expressed their interest and a short trial at Aris, Gesios signed for Iraklis. He was Iraklis' league top scorer for 1973–74, 1975–76, 1976–77 and 1977–78 scoring 12, 9, 12 and 13 goals respectively. He was also in the starting line up in Iraklis' 1976 Cup win and scored the club's fourth goal in overtime. Gesios played for Iraklis until the 1979–80 season reaching 74 league goals and becoming the club's league all-time top scorer.

In 1980 Gesios signed for AEK Athens playing for the club for the 1980–81 season appearing in 22 league games and scoring 7 goals. In summer of 1982, he finished his career playing for Veria.

International career
Gesios made his debut for Greece in a friendly 0-1 home loss against Israel on 22 September 1976. Totally he gained 5 caps for Greece.

After football
Gesios lives in Kozani where he runs a furniture store.

Honours

Iraklis
Greek Cup: 1975–76

References

1948 births
Living people
Greece international footballers
Greek footballers
Iraklis Thessaloniki F.C. players
Kozani F.C. players
AEK Athens F.C. players
Veria F.C. players
Super League Greece players
Association football forwards
Footballers from Naousa, Imathia